HD 96146 (HR 4313) is a binary star located in the southern constellation Antlia. The system has a combined apparent magnitude of 5.41, making it visible to the naked eye under ideal conditions. Parallax measurements from the Gaia spacecraft place the pair at a distance of 710 light years with a large margin of error.

The object's status as a double star was not known until a 1991 Hipparcos survey of double stars. The secondary has been observed using speckle interferometry to be 1.8 magnitudes fainter than the visible star.

The primary has a stellar classification of A0 V, indicating that it is an ordinary A-type main-sequence star. Zorec and Royer (2012) model it as a dwarf star that is 99.5% through its main sequence lifetime, close to the subgiant phase. HD 96146 is currently 291 million years old and unlike most hot stars, spins modestly with a projected rotational velocity of only .

References

A-type main-sequence stars
Antlia
096146
054173
4313
CD-35 06954
Antliae, 85
Binary stars